Yabeiceras is an extinct genus of cephalopods belonging to the ammonite family Collignoniceratidae. They flourished during the Coniacian age, and lived in South Africa.

Species
The species in the genus Yabeiceras include:
 Y. ankinatsyense
 Y. cobbani
 Y. costatum
 Y. crassiornatum
 Y. manasoaense
 Y. orientale (type species)
 Y. transiens

References

Ammonitida genera
Collignoniceratidae
Cretaceous ammonites
Ammonites of Africa
Cretaceous Africa
Ammonites of South America
Coniacian life